Ilya Zatenko (born 14 January 1994) is a Belarusian professional footballer. As of 2021, he plays for Leskhoz Gomel.

External links
 
 
 Profile at Gomel website

1994 births
Living people
Belarusian footballers
People from Zhlobin District
Sportspeople from Gomel Region
Association football forwards
FC Gomel players
FC Lokomotiv Gomel players
FC Khimik Svetlogorsk players
FC Zhlobin players
FC Belshina Bobruisk players
FC Sputnik Rechitsa players